Brendan Rogers (born February 25, 1968) is a Canadian retired professional football linebacker and defensive back who played for nine years in the Canadian Football League (CFL). He was drafted in the fourth round, 32nd overall by the Winnipeg Blue Bombers in the 1991 CFL Draft. He played in five seasons with the Blue Bombers and tied a CFL record in 1994 for most special teams tackles in a single game with seven. Rogers played in four Grey Cup championship games, winning twice with the Toronto Argonauts in 1996 and 1997. He finished his career with the Saskatchewan Roughriders and, as of 2019, is third all-time in career special teams tackles with 176.

He played college football for the Eastern Washington Eagles.

References

1968 births
Living people
Canadian football linebackers
Canadian football defensive backs
Canadian football people from Vancouver
Players of Canadian football from British Columbia
Toronto Argonauts players
Winnipeg Blue Bombers players
Eastern Washington Eagles football players
Canadian players of American football